Auristomia is a genus of sea snails, marine gastropod mollusks in the family Pyramidellidae, the pyrams and their allies.

Species
Species within the genus Auristomia include:
 Auristomia barashi (Bogi & Galil, 2000)
 Auristomia erjaveciana (Brusina, 1869)
 Auristomia fusulus (Monterosato, 1878)
 Auristomia ignorata Monterosato, 1917
 Auristomia nofronii (Buzzurro, 2002)
 Auristomia rutor (Nofroni & Schander, 1994)

Possibly also: 
 Odostomia (Auristomia) pyxidata Schander, 1994

Fossil species
 Auristomia gagliniae Tringali, 1999

Description

References

 Monterosato T. A. (di) (1884). Nomenclatura generica e specifica di alcune conchiglie mediterranee. Palermo, Virzi, 152 pp

External links
 To World Register of Marine Species

Pyramidellidae